The Checkered Flag is a 1963 film, directed by William Grefe.

Plot
The alcoholic wife of a rich car racing champion persuades a young driver to kill her husband.

Cast
Charles G. Martin as Rutherford
Evelyn King as Bo Rutherford, his wife
Joe Morrison as Bill Garrison
Peggy Vendig as Ginger

Production
It was Grefe's first script. He was originally hired only as writer but took over direction when the original director fell ill.

References

External links

The Checkered Flag at Films de France
The Checkered Flag at TCMDB

1963 films
1963 drama films
American auto racing films
American drama films
Films directed by William Grefe
1960s English-language films
1960s American films